Louis of Savoy (1436–37 ; April 1482), Count of Geneva from 1460, became King of Cyprus in 1460 upon his second marriage to Charlotte of Cyprus, reigning together with and in the right of his wife until 1463. He was the second son and namesake of Louis, Duke of Savoy and his wife, Anne of Lusignan, daughter of King Janus of Cyprus.

Life
Louis was born, according to Samuel Guichenon, in June 1431, in Geneva, but the historian specifies in note that he was born in 1436. The birth in June 1436 is therefore that adopted by contemporary authors. Guichenon also specifies that the prince is 8 years old when he married in 1444. Some mention a period between 1436 and 1437,  especially for this last year the Swiss historian Édouard Mallet (1805-1856).

On 14 December 1444, at Stirling Castle, he was married to Annabella, youngest daughter of King James I of Scotland (d. 1437) and sister of King James II of Scotland. The official wedding never took place and the marriage was annulled in 1458.

On 7 October 1458, his cousin  Charlotte became Queen of Cyprus. He married her on 7 October 1459 and became King of Cyprus as well as the titular King of Jerusalem and of the Armenian Kingdom of Cilicia for the brief period of her reign from 1458 to 1463, when they were deposed.

Louis died in April 1482, at the priory of Ripaille.

Notes

References

Sources

Kings of Cyprus
15th-century monarchs in Europe
1430s births
1482 deaths
15th century in Cyprus
Counts of Geneva
People from Geneva
Princes of Savoy